The Platino Award for Best Actress (Spanish: Premio Platino a la mejor actriz/Premio Platino a la mejor interpretación femenina) is one of the Platino Awards, Ibero-America's film awards presented annually by the Entidad de Gestión de Derechos de los Productores Audiovisuales (EGEDA) and the Federación Iberoamericana de Productores Cinematográficos y Audiovisuales (FIPCA). 

It was first awarded in 2014, with Chilean actress Paulina García being the first recipient of the award, for her role as Gloria Cumplido in Gloria. Until the 7th edition in 2020, female supporting performances were included in this category. In 2021, the category for Best Supporting Actress was created.

No actress has received this award for than once while Penélope Cruz and Antonia Zegers are the most nominated actresses in this category with three nominations each, followed by Paulina García, Laura de la Uz, Natalia Oreiro, Ilse Salas and Emma Suárez with two nominations each.

2022 nominee Penélope Cruz also received a nomination for the Academy Award for Best Actress for Parallel Mothers.

In the list below the winner of the award for each year is shown first, followed by the other nominees.

Winners and nominees

2010s

2020s

See also
 Goya Award for Best Actress
 Goya Award for Best Supporting Actress

References

External links
Official site

Platino Awards
Film awards for lead actress